Quarmby is a district of Huddersfield, West Yorkshire, England. It is situated 2 miles west of Huddersfield town centre between Oakes, Paddock and Longwood.

The holders of the manor in the reign of Edward the Confessor 1042–66 were Gamel and Godwin, but the landlord at the time of the Domesday Book was Ilbert de Lacy. The Lacy family in Normandy derived their name from the commune of Lassy, the Lacius or Latius estates in the county of Calvados. The village of Lassy today is near the town of Vire in France. The name, originally Cornbei, is said to have been given by de Lacy.

See also
Listed buildings in Huddersfield (Lindley Ward)

Areas of Huddersfield